Blundell is both a surname and a given name. Notable people with the name include:

Surname:
Bryan Blundell (c. 1675–1756), English merchant and slave trader
Christine Blundell (born 1961), British make-up artist
Daphne Blundell (1916–2004), British naval officer
Denis Blundell (1907–1984), Governor-General of New Zealand
Sir Francis Blundell, 3rd Baronet (1643–1707), Irish baronet and politician
Graeme Blundell (born 1945), Australian actor, director, producer, writer and biographer
Gregg Blundell (born 1977), English footballer
Hannah Blundell (born 1994), English footballer
Henry Blundell (art collector) (1724–1810), English art collector
Henry Blundell (MP) (1831–1906), British MP
Henry Blundell (publisher) (1813–1878), New Zealand newspaper publisher
James Blundell (physician) (1791–1878), British obstetrician
James Blundell (singer) (born 1964), Australian country music singer
John Blundell (actor) (21st century), British actor
John Blundell (economist) (born 1952), Director General at the Institute of Economic Affairs
Katherine Blundell, Professor of Astrophysics at the University of Oxford
Margaret Blundell (1907–1996), British artist
Mark Blundell (born 1966), former Formula One, sports car, and CART racing driver
Mary Blundell (1859-1930), Novelist
Peter Blundell (c. 1520–1601), prosperous clothier
Reginald Blundell (20th century), Australian politician
Richard Blundell (born 1952), British economist
Stephen Blundell (21st century), experimental physicist
Tom Blundell (born 1942), British biologist
 Tom Blundell (born 1990) New Zealand cricketer
William Blundell (born 1947), Australian painter and art forger
William R. C. Blundell (born 1927), Canadian businessman

Given name:
Peter Blundell Jones (21st century), British architect, historian, academic and critic
Sir John Blundell Maple, 1st Baronet (1845–1903), English business magnate
William Blundell Spence (1814–1900), English artist and art dealer

See also
Blundell Park
Ince Blundell
Blundellsands
Viscount Blundell